Scottdale Historic District is a national historic district located at Scottdale, Westmoreland County, Pennsylvania. It encompasses 242 contributing buildings and 1 contributing structure in the central business district and surrounding residential areas of Scottdale.  They were built between about 1853 and 1950, and includes a mix of residential, commercial, institutional, and industrial properties. They are in a variety of popular architectural styles including Italianate, Queen Anne, and Colonial Revival. Notable buildings include the Duraloy Technologies complex, Uptegraff Manufacturing Company, Scottsdale Savings and Trust (1907), DeMuth Flowers (1887), Loucks Hardware Company (c. 1880), Cossels Food Mart (1914), Frick Coke Company offices (1887, 1906), Broadway Drug Store (c. 1935), Calvin United Presbyterian Church (1898), First Baptist Church (1906), former high school (c. 1920), A.K. Stauffer House (c. 1880), E.H. Reid House (1905-1910), and a Lustron house (1950).

It was added to the National Register of Historic Places in 1996.

References

Historic districts on the National Register of Historic Places in Pennsylvania
Italianate architecture in Pennsylvania
Queen Anne architecture in Pennsylvania
Colonial Revival architecture in Pennsylvania
Historic districts in Westmoreland County, Pennsylvania
National Register of Historic Places in Westmoreland County, Pennsylvania